David Tkeshelashvili (born 16 October 1969) is a Georgian politician who served as the Head of Presidential Administration of Georgia.

Early years
Tkeshelashvili was born on 16 October 1969 in Tbilisi, Georgia. From 1987-1989, he served in the Soviet Army. After the dissolution of the Soviet Union, he worked as the head, political secretary and deputy chairman of the Regional Department of the Citizens' Union's Youth Branch from 1993-1995, serving as the organization's press secretary from 1994 to 1995. In 1995, he was elected to the Georgian Parliament becoming deputy majority leader. A year later, Tkeshelashvili graduated from Tbilisi State University with a degree in Law.

From 1998-2002, he was the chairman of the youth branch of the Citizen's Union.

In 1999, he was re-elected to the parliament, working as chairman of the Subcommittee for Relations with Media and Non-governmental Organizations of the Human Rights Committee from 1999 through 2003. In 2004, Tkeshelashvili was re-elected as MP for the third term from National Movement - Democrats. The following year, he won Edmund S. Muskie scholarship, subsequently obtaining LLM from Emory University in 2006. At the university, he was conferred with Sheth Distinguished International Alumni Award.

Political career
In 2006-2007, Tkeshelashvili served as the Minister of Environment Protection and Natural Resources. As the minister, he was able to sign park partnership agreements with the US government which ensured financial and technical assistance to Georgia and the establishment of a sister-park relationship between Point Reyes and Kolkheti National Park. In 2007-2008, he was Minister of Health, Labour and Social Affairs. On 31 January 2008, he was appointed Minister of Regional Development and Infrastructure.

See also
Cabinet of Georgia

References

1969 births
Government ministers of Georgia (country)
People from Tbilisi
Living people